Atomgods were a UK heavy rock band from late 1980s. The band were formed by former Inner City Unit guitarist Judge Trev Thoms, the first recording lineup consisting of Hiro Sasaki and Kofi Baker (Ginger's son). They were signed to GWR Records producing the 1988 album WOW! and the 1991 album History Re-Written. 

For the second album, which saw the band shorten their name to Atomgod and took on a thrash metal direction. Thoms was joined by bassist Algy Ward (The Damned and Tank), guitarist Bill Liesegang (Nina Hagen Band), and drummer Steve Clarke of Fastway

Judge Trev Thoms went on to form Mother of All Bands (MOAB) with Hawkwind's ex Bassist/Frontman, Ron Tree and produced the album "Insect Brain" on Real Festival Music. In 2007 Judge Trev returned to playing with former Hawkwind sax player Nik Turner in the reformed Inner City Unit but unfortunately died on 8 December 2010 from pancreatic cancer.

Atomgod drummer Steve Clarke went on to form the band Necropolis, producing the 1993 End Of The Line album released on Neat Records in 1997.

There are unconfirmed reports that Motörhead guitarists Würzel and Fast Eddie Clarke contributed to some recordings, but Fast Eddie certainly did play on the Necropolis album.

Atomgods - WOW!

Track list
"Camden Town"
"Dolphins" (Thoms)
"Bashin' Up the Rich" (Thoms)
"Atlantic Waves" (Thoms)
"Dog Rot" (Thoms)
"Oh Yea"
"Slow Down Motörhead"
"Mountain Range"
"Convoy"
"Oh No"

Personnel
Trev Thoms - Vocals, Guitar
Hiro Sasaki - Bass
Kofi Baker - Drums

Release History
GWR Records - GWLP30, 1988

Atomgod - History Re-Written

Track list
"Atom God"
"Radio Death"
"Virgin Blood"
"History Re-Written Part 1"
"Welcome To The Kingdom Of Doom"
"History Re-Written Part 2"
"Cesspit (Cauldron Of Death)"
"(Death Will Come From) China" (Thoms/Clark/Ward)

Personnel
Trev Thoms - Vocals, Guitar
Bill Liesegang - Guitar
Algy Ward - Bass
Steve Clarke  - Drums

Release History
GWR Records - GWLP??, 1991
Progressive International PRO 026 1992

Necropolis - End Of The Line

Track list
Victim
Samaritan
A Taste For Killing
Shadowman
145 Speed Overload
The Bitterness I Taste

Personnel
John Knight - Vocals (Blueprint for Bedlam album)
Sven Olaffsen - Vocals
Trev Thoms - Guitar
Bill Liesegang - Guitar
Keith More - Guitar
'Fast' Eddie Clarke - Guitar
Algy Ward - Bass
Lee Phillips - Keyboards/vocals
Steve Clarke -  Drums

Release History
Neat Metal - NM021, 1997

References 

English heavy metal musical groups
English rock music groups